Suryodaya Higher Secondary School is a private, English language school administered by the government of Nepal. It was founded in 2014.

Educational institutions established in 2014
Schools in Nepal
2014 establishments in Nepal